On 1 January 2011, Kolavia Flight 348, a Tupolev Tu-154 on a domestic scheduled passenger flight from Surgut to Moscow, Russia, caught fire and burned down while taxiing out for take-off. Passengers were evacuated, but three were killed and 43 injured. A subsequent investigation concluded that the fire had started in an electric panel for which maintenance was never prescribed.

Accident
On the morning of 1 January 2011, Flight 348 was preparing to depart at Surgut International Airport for a flight to Moscow. At 10:00 local time (05:00 UTC), as the aircraft was being pushed back and was starting its engines, a fire developed in the centre section of the fuselage, quickly spreading inside the passenger cabin.

The engines and the APU were immediately shut down and the emergency slides were deployed for an emergency evacuation. Within four minutes, fire engines reached the Tupolev and started dousing the flames with foam, but were hampered by the presence of survivors near the aircraft. By 10:20, the aircraft was completely ablaze, with aviation fuel leaking and spreading the flames across the apron.

The fire was brought under control at around 10:40; by then, only the tail section and the outer portion of the wings had survived the blaze. Three passengers were killed and 43 were injured, four critically, from smoke inhalation or burns.

Aircraft

The aircraft involved was a tri-jet Tupolev Tu-154B-2, registration RA-85588, msn 83A/588. The aircraft first flew in 1983. It entered service with Aeroflot as CCCP-85588 and was re-registered RA-85588 in 1993. It then served with Mavial Magadan Airlines between 1994 and 1999, when it began service with Vladivostok Air. Kogalymavia (trading as Kolavia) acquired the aircraft in 2007.

Passengers and crew
The aircraft was carrying 116 passengers, 8 crew, and 10 off-duty employees of Kogalymavia, although a statement by the Russia's Ministry of Health and Social Development gave figures of 117 passengers and 18 crew. Among the passengers were members of the 1990s Russian boy band Na Na, who managed to evacuate safely from the plane.

Aftermath
Following the accident, Russia's Federal Transport Oversight Agency advised airlines that they should stop using the Tu-154B until the accident had been investigated. This would affect 14 aircraft, all other Tu-154s in service are Tu-154Ms. Kogalymavia pledged to pay compensation of руб 20,000 to those passengers involved in the accident. The Russian insurance company Sogaz stated that those injured in the accident would receive between руб 20,000 and руб 2,000,000 compensation. The families of those killed would receive руб 2,000,000 compensation. Authorities in the Khanty–Mansi Autonomous Okrug – Yugra had allocated руб 10,000,000 to assist the families of those injured in the accident.

Investigation

Russia's Interstate Aviation Committee (MAK) opened an investigation into the accident. A separate criminal investigation was opened to investigate allegations of breaching transport and fire safety rules. Both flight recorders were recovered and analysed. Russia's Ministry of Emergency Situations stated that the initial investigations pointed towards an electrical short circuit being the cause of the fire, which started in the central area of the fuselage, ahead of the rear-mounted engines.

In September 2011, the MAK released its final report in Russian, confirming that the probable cause of the fire was an arc occurring in an electric panel on the right side of the fuselage hosting the generator contactors. Shortly after engine start, the crew connected the generators to the electrical network as usual, but the badly worn out contactors failed to operate properly, resulting in an abnormal circuit configuration that produced currents 10 to 20 times higher than their nominal values, giving rise to an electrical arc. The MAK determined that no maintenance schedule existed for the electric board in question.

References

External links
 Ту-154Б-2 RA-85588 1 January 2011. (Archive) Interstate Aviation Committee (in Russian)
 MAK Final report (Archive) (in Russian)

2011 disasters in Russia
Accidents and incidents involving the Tupolev Tu-154
Airliner accidents and incidents caused by in-flight fires
Aviation accidents and incidents in 2011
Aviation accidents and incidents in Russia
348
Surgut
January 2011 events in Russia
Aircraft fires